Parestola is a genus of longhorn beetles of the subfamily Lamiinae.

Species 
Parestola contains the following species:
 Parestola hoegei Breuning, 1943
 Parestola tubericollis (Breuning, 1980)
 Parestola zapotensis Bates, 1880

References

Desmiphorini